Prospect is a 2018 American science fiction indie film. The film was written and directed by Zeek Earl and Chris Caldwell and stars Pedro Pascal, Sophie Thatcher, and Jay Duplass. It features a teenage girl and her father traveling to an alien moon with a contract to mine gems in the moon's poisonous forest. On the moon, the father is driven by greed, and the two encounter dangerous strangers in the forest.

Plot 
A teenage girl, Cee, and her father, Damon, descend in a landing pod from a transport spaceship to the surface of a forest moon covered in poisonous spores to mine for gems. They suffer a technical malfunction during the descent which cripples the lander and the pair touch down some distance away from their planned prospecting site. The duo begin traveling to the site on foot and comes across an abandoned dig site. Damon and Cee extract a fleshy pod from the earth and dissect it to reveal a valuable gem. Cee implores her father to take the gem and return to the lander, but Damon insists they continue to the original landing site.

The pair set out again, and Damon is approached by two rival prospectors: Ezra and his silent companion. Ezra and his partner plan to rob Damon and hold him at gunpoint, but Damon suggests in a counter-offer that they join forces. Damon explains that he has been contacted to assist a group of mercenaries who stumbled upon the legendary 'queen's lair', a dig site of extraordinary value. Damon suggests that rather than digging for the mercenaries, Ezra, his companion, and Damon can work together and take the entire dig for themselves.

Ezra agrees, but Cee, who has been hiding throughout this encounter, ambushes the two hostile prospectors with a rifle - allowing Damon to wrest a weapon from Ezra before taking the latter and his partner hostage. Damon attempts to rob Ezra, but the partner attacks him and the pair shoot each other. Ezra's partner is killed and Damon is mortally wounded before being executed by Ezra himself.

Cee flees back to her damaged lander, which fails to start, and is found by Ezra several hours later. When Ezra attempts to enter, Cee wounds him in the arm with her rifle and takes him prisoner. Ezra suggests that they follow Damon's original plan and aid the mercenaries in exchange for passage on the mercenaries' ship. Cee reluctantly agrees, and the pair sets out for the queen's lair. Ezra's wound has become infected by the poisonous spores in the atmosphere, and so the pair approaches a group of human villagers with the intent to trade for medical treatment. The villagers instead offer a trade of gems in exchange for Cee. As Ezra asks about details of the offer, Cee flees the village and escapes pursuit by the villagers.

After wandering the planet alone, Cee runs into Ezra once again. His wound has worsened considerably, and Cee helps him amputate his arm. The pair set out once more and soon arrives at the mercenary camp surrounding the queen's lair. After negotiating passage on the mercenaries' ship, Cee and Ezra attempt to fulfill their end of the contract and extract gems from the queen's lair. They fail several extraction attempts, and as their mercenary guard turns to report their failure, Ezra attacks and kills him. The commotion attracts the rest of the mercenaries, and a fight ensues. Several mercenaries are killed, and Ezra is gravely wounded. Cee tends to Ezra's wound, and the pair escape into orbit on the mercenaries' ship.

Cast
 Sophie Thatcher as Cee
 Jay Duplass as Damon
 Pedro Pascal as Ezra
 Luke Pitzrick as Ezra’s companion, Number Two
 Arthur Deranleau as Fahr
 Andre Royo as Oruf
 Alex McCauley as Bahr
 Doug Dawson as Heshir
 Krista Johnson as Gali
 Brian Gunter as Mesur
 Sheila Vand as Inumon
 Anwan Glover as Mikken
 Trick Danneker as Jack
 Christopher Morson as Zed
 Ben Little as a Prisoner
 Shepheard Earl as a Conductor

Production
Zeek Earl and Chris Caldwell met at the Seattle Pacific University. They formed the production company Shep Films and initially made commercials before making short films. They first produced Prospect as a short film, with a $21,000 budget which they raised through Kickstarter. The short  drew attention after premiering at the 2014 SXSW Film Festival, ultimately becoming a hit on Vimeo.    

After that they wanted to make Prospect into a feature length film. The duo presented the pitch to studios and secured a $4,000,000 financing from the Canadian BRON Studios.

They wanted seven months to make the film's ships, costumes, and weapons. For that they moved into a former ship-building warehouse in Fremont, Seattle “We hired a lot of people who'd never worked on a movie before: industrial designers, carpenters, mechanics, cosplayers," said Caldwell. "They were working with us as the script was being written, and by the time we got the green light, we had this kind of art collective under one roof." The production team used a Computer Numeric Control kit to create much of the ship's interiors.

All of Prospect's exterior shots were filmed on a private land trust adjacent to the Olympic National Park, Washington.

Release
Prospect premiered on March 5, 2018 at the 2018 South by Southwest Film Festival, where it won the Adam Yauch Hörnblowér Award. The company Gunpowder and Sky, under their label Dust, released the film in Regal Cinemas theaters on November 2, 2018. The film was released on video-on-demand and home media on March 8, 2019.

Critical reception

The website's critical consensus reads, "Fueled by character development and setting instead of special effects, Prospect is a sci-fi story whose style is defined—and enriched—by its limitations." The similar website Metacritic assessed 8 reviews and reported 6 as positive and 2 as mixed. With an overall score of 68 out of 100, it said the film had "generally favorable reviews".

Peter Debruge of Variety wrote, "Constructing character does not appear to be Earl and Caldwell’s strong suit (what’s satisfying about Cee owes almost entirely to Thatcher, a fresh face who tricks us into assuming she’s just a callow teen, when in fact, she proves to be the film’s toughest character). On the other hand, the duo show a real aptitude for world building."

References

External links
  

2018 science fiction films
2018 films
American science fiction films
Films about mining
Films set in forests
Films set on fictional moons
2010s English-language films
Space Western films
2010s American films